Chandrasekhar, Chandrashekhar or Chandra Shekhar is an Indian name and may refer to a number of individuals.  The name comes from the name of an incarnation of the Hindu god Shiva. In this form he married the goddess Parvati. Etymologically, the name comes from the Sanskrit words "चन्द्र (candra)", meaning "moon", and "शेखर (śekhara)", meaning "crest" or "crown", which is an epithet of the Shiva.

Notable people with this name

In politics and activism:
 Chandra Shekhar Azad (1906–1931), known as Azad ("The Free"), Indian revolutionary who organised the Hindustan Socialist Republican Army (HSRA)
 K. M. Chandrasekhar (born 1948), Indian Cabinet Secretary
 Sripati Chandrasekhar (1918–2001), an Indian demographer and politician
 Chandra Shekhar Dubey (born 1946), member of the 14th Lok Sabha of India
 Chandrashekhar Prasad (died 1997), assassinated Indian student activist
 Kalvakuntla Chandrashekar Rao (born 1954), known as K.C.R., Indian politician and the first Chief Minister of Telangana
 Chandra Shekhar Singh, known as Chandra Shekhar (1927–2007), eighth Prime Minister of India (1990–91)
 Chandrasekhar Singh (1915–1976), deputy leader of the Communist Party of India
 Chandrashekhar Singh, member of the Indian National Congress, Chief Minister of Bihar 1983–85

In sports:
 Bhagwat Chandrasekhar (B. S. Chandrasekhar, informally "Chandra"; born 1945), Indian cricketer
 H. Chandrashekar (nicknamed "Chandru"), Indian footballer
 O. Chandrashekar, former Indian professional footballer
 Raghavendra Chandrashekar (born 1982), Indian cricketer
 Rajesh Chandrasekar (born 1989), Indian male road and track cyclist
 Chandrasekhar Gadkari (1928–1998), Indian cricketer
 Chinta Chandrashekar Rao (born 1988), Indian football player
 Venugopal Chandrasekhar, Indian table tennis player

In arts and entertainment:
 Chandrashekar Bandiyappa, known as CSB, South Indian film director
 Bala Devi Chandrashekar, American Bharatanatyam dancer
 Hitha Chandrashekar, Indian film actress who works in Kannada films
 Jay Chandrasekhar (born 1968), American film actor, director and writer
 Joseph Vijay Chandrashekar (known simply as Vijay), Indian film actor and playback singer who works in Tamil cinema (Kollywood)
 Lakshmi Chandrashekar, Indian film actress in the Kannada film industry, and a theatre artist in Karnataka, India
 Nagathihalli Chandrashekhar, Indian director, actor, screenwriter and lyricist working predominantly in Kannada cinema
 Vagai Chandrasekhar (known simply as Chandrasekhar), Kollywood film actor
 Chandrashekhar Dubey (1924–1993), Indian actor and radio personality
 Chandrashekhara Kambara (born 1937), Indian poet, playwright, and professor
 Chandrashekhar Vaidya (known simply as Chandrashekhar; 1922–2021), Bollywood film actor
 Chandra Sekhar Yeleti (born 1973), Tollywood film director

In science and academia:
 Hariharan Chandrashekar (born 1956), Indian environmental economist, eco-entrepreneur, writer, and policy advocate and urban analyst
 Sivaramakrishna Chandrasekhar (1930–2004), Indian physicist
 Srinivasan Chandrasegaran, pioneer in genome editing
 Srinivasan Chandrasekaran (born 1945), Indian chemist
 Subrahmanyan Chandrasekhar (1910–1995), British Indian-American astrophysicist and Nobel laureate in physics, after whom the astrophysics formula Chandrasekhar limit and quantity Chandrasekhar number are named
 Tavarekere Kalliah Chandrashekar (born 1956), Indian bioinorganic chemist, former director of National Institute for Interdisciplinary Science & Technology
 Chandrasekhara Venkata Raman (1888–1970), Indian physicist and Nobel laureate in physics
 Chandrashekhar Khare, professor of mathematics at the University of California Los Angeles
 Chandra Sekhar Sankurathri, founder of free Sarada Vidyalayam School and Srikiran Institute of Ophthalmology
 Y. S. Chandrashekhar, Indian-American cardiologist

In business:
 Chandrashekhar Agashe (1888–1956), Indian industrialist

See also
 Anna University K B Chandrashekar Research Centre in the Madras Institute of Technology (MIT)
 Chandrahar